Calvary Cemetery is a Roman Catholic cemetery in Seattle, Washington, United States, located in the Ravenna/Bryant neighborhood. Dedicated on December 1, 1889, it is situated on the southwest slope of a hill overlooking University Village, about a mile (1.6 km) northeast of the University of Washington. It is owned and operated by the Archdiocese of Seattle.

Around 40,000 people  are buried in its grounds, including:
Vivian E. Albertson, Bellevue School District director from 1982 to 1990
Dave Beck, former president of the Teamsters
"Tioga George" Burns, baseball player, the American League's most valuable player in 1926.
John Cherberg, lieutenant governor for 32 years, UW football player and head coach
Raymond E. Davis, Medal of Honor recipient in 1905
Hec Edmundson, basketball and track coach at the University of Washington
Walter Galbraith, former president of Galbraith and Co. and director of Washington Mutual
Tubby Graves, baseball head coach at UW
Michael J. "Moose" Heney, Alaskan railroad builder
Al Hostak, middleweight boxer
Jacob Nist, founder of Queen City Manufacturing Company, now the Seattle-Tacoma Box Company
Edward Nordhoff, founder of The Bon Marché department store chain
William Piggott, founder of Paccar
Albert Rosellini, former governor

Additionally, priests of the Archdiocese of Seattle and clergy from a number of religious orders are buried at the cemetery.  There is one British Commonwealth war grave, of a Canadian Army soldier of World War I.

References

External links
Associated Catholic Cemeteries, Archdiocese of Seattle - Calvary Cemetery
Find a Grave: Calvary Cemetery

Cemeteries in Seattle
Roman Catholic cemeteries in the United States
Ravenna, Seattle